Denis is a masculine given name. Notable people with the name include:

Denis Akiyama (1952–2018), Canadian actor
Denis Cheryshev (born 1990), Russian footballer
Denis Darbellay (born 1998), Swiss footballer
Denis Diderot (1713–1784), French philosopher and co-founder of the Encyclopédie
Denis Dufour (born 1953), composer of art music
Denis Fonvizin, Russian writer
Denis Glushakov, Russian footballer
Denis Grachev (badminton), Russian badminton player
Denis Grachev (fighter), Russian boxer, kickboxer and mixed martial artist
Denis Haruț, Romanian footballer
Denis Hayes, environmentalist and Earth Day founder
Denis Healey (1917–2015), British politician
Denis Howell (1923–1998), British politician
Denis Irwin (born 1965), Irish footballer
Denis Johnson (1949–2017), American writer
Denis King, British composer
Denis Kolodin (born 1982), Russian footballer
Denis Laktionov, Russian footballer
Denis Lavant (born 1961), French actor
Denis Law (born 1940), former Manchester United centre-forward
Denis Lawson, Scottish actor
Denis Leary, American actor and comedian
Denis Lebedev, Russian boxer
Denis Lebrun, comic artist (Blondie strip)
Denis Legersky (born 1987), Slovak ice hockey player and coach
Denis Lian (born 1972), Singaporean race car driver
Denis Loktev (born 2000), Israeli swimmer
Denis Manturov (born 1969), Russian politician
Denis Marconato, Italian basketball player
Denis McDonough, American politician, appointed President Obama's second-term Chief of Staff
Denis Menke (1940–2020), American baseball player
Denis Perera (1930–2013), 8th Commander of the Sri Lanka Army
Denis Petrashov (born 2000), Kyrgyzstani swimmer
Denis Pushilin (born 1981), Ukrainian politician, head of the Donetsk People's Republic
Denis Shapovalov (born 1999), Israeli-Canadian tennis player
Denis Smith (English cricketer) (1907–1979), English cricketer
Denis Smith (footballer, born 1947), English footballer and manager
Denis Stracqualursi (born 1987), Argentine footballer
Denis Suárez (born 1994), Spanish footballer 
Denis Tahirović (born 1985), Croatian footballer
Denis Ten (1993–2018), Kazakhstani figure skater
Denis Thatcher (1915–2003), British businessman, husband of former British Prime Minister Margaret Thatcher
Denis Thwaites (1944–2015), English professional footballer murdered in the 2015 Sousse attacks
Denis Villeneuve, French Canadian film director and writer
Denis Voronenkov (1971–2017), Russian politician
Denis Wucherer (born 1973), German basketball coach and former player
Denis Zvizdić (born 1964), Bosnia and Herzegovina politician, Chairman of the Council of Ministers

See also
Denis (disambiguation), for people known only by the name "Denis"
Dennis

French masculine given names
Montenegrin masculine given names
Romanian masculine given names
Masculine given names
English masculine given names
Russian masculine given names
Theophoric names
Dionysus